Traces of an Amorous Life is a 1990 Italian romance-drama film directed by Peter Del Monte. It entered the competition at the 47th Venice International Film Festival.

Cast
 Luciano Bartoli as the boss
 Valeria Golino as Lucia Fontana
 Walter Chiari as Giorgio
 Chiara Caselli as Carla
 Laura Morante as Agnese
 Massimo Dapporto as Mario
 Roberto De Francesco as Luigi
 Roberto Herlitzka as the teacher
 Valeria Milillo as Lisa
 Andrea Occhipinti as Agnese
 Claudia Pozzi as Arianna, the secretary
 Stefano Dionisi as the petty thief
 Gioele Dix as the businessman
 Giovanni Guidelli as Lisa's ex-boyfriend
 Fabrizia Sacchi as Beatrice
 Stefania Sandrelli as woman in department store
 Renato Scarpa as Giuseppe Breschi

References

External links
 

1990 films
Italian romantic drama films
Films directed by Peter Del Monte
Films scored by Ennio Morricone
Films scored by Nicola Piovani
1990 romantic drama films
1990s Italian-language films
1990s Italian films